The Luban languages are a group of Bantu languages spoken by the Lubas in the south of DRC Congo, established by Christine Ahmed (1995). They constitute half of Guthrie's Zone L. The languages, or clusters, along with their Guthrie identifications, are:

 Yazi (L20)
Songe (Songye), Binji (L20)
Hemba: Hemba (L20), Kebwe (L30), Bangubangu of Kabambare (D20)
Luba (L30): Kaonde (L40), Kete (L20), Kanyok, Luba-Kasai (TshiLuba), Luba-Katanga (KiLuba)–Sanga–Zela, Bangubangu (of Mutingua, D20)

The remaining L20 (Songe) languages, Lwalu, Luna, and Budya, presumably belong here.

Notes